Atriplex codonocarpa, the flat-topped saltbush, is a species of flowering plant in the family Amaranthaceae, native to Western Australia. It is often found growing on the outer edges of salt lakes.

References

codonocarpa
Endemic flora of Australia
Endemic flora of Western Australia
Plants described in 1984